L'Almée is a yacht built in 1886 by the Chantiers de la Seine of Argenteuil. She is now a maritime store at Aix-les-Bains, on the Lac du Bourget.

Ship history
L'Almée is a yacht built in 1886 by the Chantiers de la Seine of Argenteuil for Henri Menier, a French chocolate-maker, who had drawn its plans. The ship was launched on May 10, 1887.

On October 24, 1893, during an official visit to Paris, Counter admiral and baron Jean Théobald Lagé, president of the Union des yachts français, gave counter admiral Theodor Avellan, major of the Russian Squadron in the Mediterranean Sea, a diploma of honorary member of the Union and a commemorative gold medal on board the yacht.

On September 6, 1913, Henri Menier died and his yacht was laid up on the Oise. The next year, World War I began and the L'Almée was requisitioned by the Marine Nationale. It was used as a patrol boat until the end of the war when it came back to the Oise. It was bought by the Domaines de l'État and moored on the Marne. In 1926, it was bought by the Compagnie de Navigation du Lac, jointly managed by Michel Clappier and Félix Bal, and brought to the Lac du Bourget. In 1929, Michel Clappier became the only manager of the company and Félix Bal created a competing company in 1930, the Société Nouvelle de Navigation – Les cygnes du Lac.

L'Almée was then used as a barge to transport wood or was aground in Memard Bay (North West of Aix-les-Bains). During the Second World War, it stayed aground in this bay (located only some meters away from its current location). It was plundered during the conflict.

At the end of the war, it was bought by the Société de l'Étoile du Lac and transformed into a ferry-boat. It was renamed Hautecombe and, in 1947, it began its crossings between Aix-les-Bains and Hautecombe Abbey, alternating with the ferry La Savoie.

On August 18, 1969, the cruise ship La Fraidieu sunk near Ripaille Castle, then the ship Sainte-Odile capsized on August 7, 1970 near Yvoire. In total, the sinking of these ships killed 31 people; 24 in the first shipwreck and 7 in the second. To avoid new tragedies, the freshwater navigation rules were reinforced. Due to these new regulations, the Hautecombe had to be retired from service, that was done in September 1970. Daniel Carraz bought it and removed the motors, then used it as storage facility.

In 1976, Alain Prud'homme bought the ferry Hautecombe and used it as headquarters for his sailing school. The ship took back its original name and was moored at the Grand Port of Aix-les-Bains, near the docks for the company's ships . It was later converted into a maritime store. On February 8, 2015, it dragged its anchor and a part of its gangway was snatched due to strong winds. The ship was not damaged and the gangway was repaired some days later.

References

Annexes

Linked articles 
 Lac du Bourget
 Aix-les-Bains

External links

Bibliography 
 
 
 
 

1887 ships
Ships built in France
Steam yachts